Littleton is a village in Schuyler County, Illinois, United States. The population was 197 at the 2000 census.

Geography
Littleton is located at  (40.231956, -90.618948).

Demographics

At the 2000 census, there were 197 people, 69 households and 50 families residing in the village. The racial make up was 98.48% White, 1.02% African American, and 0.51% from two or more races. Hispanic or Latino of any race were 3.55% of the population.

There were 69 households, of which 39.1% had children under the age of 18 living with them, 65.2% were married couples living together, 4.3% had a female householder with no husband present, and 26.1% were non-families. 20.3% of all households were made up of individuals, and 8.7% had someone living alone who was 65 years of age or older. The average household size was 2.86 and the average family size was 3.29.

29.9% of the population were under the age of 18, 10.7% from 18 to 24, 30.5% from 25 to 44, 20.3% from 45 to 64, and 8.6% were 65 years of age or older. The median age was 33 years. For every 100 females, there were 93.1 males. For every 100 females age 18 and over, there were 109.1 males.

The median household income was $43,750 and the median family income was $47,875. Males had a median income of $24,792 and females $26,042. The per capita income was $14,670. None of the families and 0.5% of the population were living below the poverty line, including no under eighteens and 7.7% of those over 64.

References

Villages in Schuyler County, Illinois
Villages in Illinois